Greg Powers is a former ice hockey goaltender who currently the head coach at his alma mater Arizona State.

Career
Greg Powers began attending Arizona State in the fall of 1995. He served as the starting goaltender for the Sun Devils for four seasons, earning all-American honors in 1997, 1998 and 1999 while being named team MVP for both his Sophomore and Junior seasons. After graduating from the Walter Cronkite School of Journalism and Mass Communication Powers returned to his alma mater in 2008 to serve as an assistant coach. After two seasons he was promoted to the head coaching position and swiftly raised the profile of the Sun Devils. In 2012–13 he led Arizona State to its first 30-win season and the following campaign took home the program's first ACHA national championship. It came as no surprise that Powers was retained as the bench boss once Arizona State announced they would become an NCAA-sponsored Division I program for the 2015–16 season.

Coach Powers has been on the Sun Devil Coaching Staff now for 14 years, and enters his seventh year as Head Coach of ASU's NCAA Division 1 Hockey Program. Coach Powers was a finalist for the 2019 & 2020 Spencer Penrose Award, which is awarded to the NCAA Division 1 Coach Of The Year.  He was also awarded the 2018–19 Frank Kush, Sun Devil Athletics Coach of the Year Award.

During the 2018–2019 hockey season, Coach Powers and his staff led the Sun Devils to become the fastest start-up program to qualify for the NCAA Division 1 Tournament in NCAA History. The Sun Devils finished the season ranked 10th in the Pairwise rankings.

Head coaching record

References

External links
 Official biography, Arizona State Sun Devils
 

American men's ice hockey goaltenders
Arizona State Sun Devils men's ice hockey players
Living people
Sportspeople from Indianapolis
Ice hockey players from Indiana
Ice hockey coaches from Indiana
1976 births